Azlan Samsudeen (born 1 April 1997) is a Sri Lankan cricketer. He made his Twenty20 debut on 6 January 2020, for Galle Cricket Club in the 2019–20 SLC Twenty20 Tournament.

References

External links
 

1997 births
Living people
Sri Lankan cricketers
Galle Cricket Club cricketers
Place of birth missing (living people)